Professor Friedrich Kiefer (9 September 1897 – 18 April 1985) was a German zoologist, specialising in freshwater copepods. For over 60 years, he was "the preeminent morphological taxonomist of continental free-living copepods".

Kiefer was born in Karlsruhe on September 6, 1897. He is commemorated in the scientific names Cyclopinula kieferi and Eurytemora kieferi.

References

1897 births
1985 deaths
German carcinologists
20th-century German zoologists
Scientists from Karlsruhe